Dato Jacob Dungau Sagan (born 26 September 1946) was the Member of Parliament of Malaysia for Baram, Sarawak, from 1995 to 2013.

Personal life 
Jacob was born in Long Anap, Ulu Baram, Sarawak. He is of the Kenyah tribe from the Orang Ulu ethnic community. He is able to speak and write English, Bahasa Malaysia (Sarawak Malay dialect), Kenyah and Kayan fluently. He also speaks the Iban and Penan languages.

Jacob holds a Bachelor of Agriculture Science from the University of Adelaide, South Australia in 1970, Postgraduate Diploma in Agricultural Education from Worcester College of Higher Education, UK (1980) and Certificate in Education, Wolverhampton Polytechnic UK (1980/1981). He continued his studies in 1985 and obtained the Certificate in Management form Asian Institute of Management. In 1991, he received a Certificate in Planning and Managing Rural Development from Asian Institute of Technology, Thailand.

He was awarded the Senior Service Fellows from John F. Kennedy School of Government, Harvard University, Massachusetts, USA in 1994. The course is equivalent to Masters in Management.

He is well trained in the art of public speaking and communication skills. He participated in Toastmasters International and was conferred the award of a Competent Toastmaster (CTM). Toastmasters International is a worldwide organisation dedicated to promote the art of public speaking. He used to conduct seminars and courses in the art of public speaking to various government departments.

Family
His father was the late Tua Kampung Taman Pulo Sagan and ex-Councillor for Baram District Council for 6 years. He is married to Datin Winnie Jolly (of mixed Iban and Chinese origins). She is one of the supreme council members of SPDP representing the women's wing quota and was previously one of the elected Sarawak National Party (SNAP) Ketua Wanita 1999–2002 and Barisan Nasional (BN) Wanita member at state and national levels.

The Civil Service and Recognitions 
On 6 July 1970, Jacob joined the Department of Agriculture, Sarawak. When he was appointed as the Assistant Director of Agriculture (Farmers Institution) (ADFI), he headed the Farmers Institution (FI) Branch in Sarawak. He conducted various leadership programmes in the planning, development, program implementation, monitoring and evaluation of the Farmers Organisation development in the State of Sarawak; covering one State Farmers Organisation and 26 Area Farmers Organisation which constitutes 100,000 Farmer members. The ADFI is responsible for four main divisions of work which are: Planning and development; Farmers Organisation management; Auditing and Accounting; and Business Management Services. Apart from that, he served in various posts in the Department of Agriculture Sarawak which included Youth Services, Agricultural Extension Services, Divisional Agriculture Officer, Farmers Training as well as staff training.

  :
  Officer of the Order of the Defender of the Realm (KMN) (1998)
  :
  Companion of the Order of the Star of Sarawak (JBS) (1998)
  Commander of the Order of the Star of Sarawak (PSBS) - Dato (2003)

Political career
Jacob entered Parliament at the 1995 election, as a member of the Sarawak National Party. He left the party in 2002, with a group of other politicians, to found the Sarawak Progressive Democratic Party (SPDP). He was re-elected to Parliament in 1999, 2004 and 2008, although was dropped as the Barisan Nasional candidate for the Baram seat at the 2013 election. For his final term in office, from 2008 to 2013, he was a Deputy Minister for International Trade and Industry.

Further reading 
 Parliament Malaysia : Official Website 
 Baram Should Be Better Prepared – Sagan
 Halliburton allowed in after company stopped arms sales
 Help road upkeep or stay out, says Sagan
 Vast Potential For Domestic Players To Invest In Water Industry 
 Sagan: Report found to be highly suspect
 Major bumpy ride along Lapok Road

References

1946 births
Living people
People from Sarawak
Malaysian Christians
Progressive Democratic Party (Malaysia) politicians
University of Adelaide alumni
Kenyah people
Asian Institute of Technology alumni
Officers of the Order of the Defender of the Realm
Asian Institute of Management alumni